Popish soap was a derisive name applied to soap manufactured under a patent granted by Charles I.  Because the board of the manufacturing company included Catholics, the term Popish Soap (after The Pope) was applied to this monopoly commodity. It was said by anti-Catholics to be particularly harmful to linen and washerwomen's hands.

During the personal rule of the English King Charles I (1629–1640), one of the ways in which he attempted to raise money was through the granting of patents. This came about as a result of a loophole in the statute forbidding such action.

One such patent was granted to a soap corporation.

The soap industry was overseen by Lord Treasurer Portland and his friends, all of whom displayed Catholic character. When Portland died, Laud and Cottington contended over the company, which increased annual profits to the crown to nearly 33,000 pounds by the end of the 1630s.

It was alleged that popish soap scarred the soul as well as skin and fabric.

Notes

References

Bibliography
 
 
 
 

Soaps